Born in Foligno in 1957, Italian researcher, chemist, and entrepreneur Catia Bastioli was always interested in chemistry and the natural world. Bastioli went on to attend the Business Management School at Bocconi University and get a degree in chemistry from the University of Perugia. She started her career as a researcher for the largest research group in Italy, Montedison, where she used her chemistry expertise to develop bioplastics with waste and agricultural raw materials. At Montedison, she helped to found a research center that later became Novamont. With this transition to Novemont, Bastioli began focusing on experimenting with eco-friendly materials and bioplastics. Bastioli now serves as CEO of Novamont, as well as President of Terna Spa of the Kyoto Club Association and a member of the Board of Directors of Fondazione Cariplo. She also served as the CEO of Matrìca, a joint venture between Novamont and Versalis.

Career
With her extensive academic and professional experience in bio plastics and renewable raw materials, Bastioli is an active investor and inventor. With a passion for sustainability and the environment, she noticed a problem that modern day innovations face when it comes to having an impact on the environment. With this problem in mind, she had a goal of developing a systematic approach to adding value to an innovative product while also decreasing its environmental harm. With the belief that science and technology can improve lives, she experimented with the development of different bio plastics. Bastioli has gone on to publish over 40 papers and be listed as the inventor of over 150 patents.

Bastioli is the prime inventor of around 80 patent families in both synthetic and natural polymers, as well as transformation processes of renewable raw materials. In fact, the European Patent Office and the European Commission awarded her as "European Inventor of the Year 2007" for her inventions in starch-based bioplastics. She was also declared Person of the Year by Bioplastic News in 2017 for her work. Through her innovations and awards, she remains committed to solving real problems faced by society.

Impact
Bastioli’s work in the bioplastic field has had a lasting impact on society today. The focus has always been on the pain point of modern innovations negatively affecting the environment. This is highlighted with her work on a breakthrough bioplastic product Mater-Biopolymer. Mater-Bi, or a family of bioplastic polymers created from plant-based feedstocks, has uses not only on replacing traditionally plastic, but also in preserving natural resources and therefore reducing an environmental impact. With an eco-design approach, Mater-Bi also solves problems with waste collection management and the environment of agricultural dispersion. This is currently aimed at solving soil degradation and greenhouse gas emission problems by creating more fertile soil through organic matter and decarbonizing the atmosphere. With the use of this innovative product, pollution due to traditional plastics can be reduced, and the pain point that she was experiencing can be resolved. With the combination of entrepreneurship and chemistry, Catia Bastioli has been transformative as a leader in the bioplastic space.

References

External links
 
 Interview with Bastioli
 Bastioli's research 
2017 Bioplastics News Person of the Year
Bastioli's 159 Patents
2019 Innovation in Bioplatics Award

Italian women chemists
Italian chief executives
Women chief executives
20th-century Italian inventors
1957 births
Living people
University of Perugia alumni
Bocconi University alumni
21st-century Italian inventors